The 12337 / 12338 Shantiniketan Express is a Express train of the Indian Railways connecting  in West Bengal and  of West Bengal. It is currently being operated with 12337/12338 train numbers on a daily basis.

Service

The 12337/ Shantiniketan Express has an average speed of 65 km/hr and covers 146 km in 2 hrs 15 mins. 12338/Shantiniketan Express has an average speed of 59 km/hr and 146 km in 2 hrs 30 mins.

Route & Halts 

The important halts of the train are:

Schedule
The schedule of this 12337/12338 Howrah–Bolpur Shantiniketan Express is given below:-

Coach composition

The train has LHB rake. The train consists of 18 coaches:

 2 A.C. Chair Car
 1 Reserved Chair Car
 13 General coaches
 2 generator car

Traction

Both trains are hauled by a Howrah-based WAP-7 electric locomotive from Howrah to Bolpur and vice versa.

Rake sharing

It shares its rake with the Agniveena Express and the Coalfield Express.

See also 

 Howrah Junction railway station
 Bolpur Shantiniketan railway station
 Agniveena Express
 Coalfield Express

Notes

External links 

 12337/Shantiniketan Express
 12338/Shantiniketan Express

References 

Rail transport in Howrah
Rail transport in West Bengal
Express trains in India
Named passenger trains of India